Right on Time may refer to:

Right on Time (Brothers Johnson album), 1977, and its title song
Right on Time (Gretchen Wilson album), 2013, or the title song
Right on Time (Harold Mabern album), 2014
"Right on Time" (song), by Brandi Carlile from In These Silent Days
"Right on Time" (Lindsay Ell song)", 2022
"Right on Time", a song by Red Hot Chili Peppers from Californication
"Right on Time", a song by Skrillex from the Bangarang EP

See also
"Ride on Time", a 1989 single by Black Box